Arthur Evan Jacobs (August 28, 1902 – June 8, 1967) was a pitcher in Major League Baseball. He played for the Cincinnati Reds in 1939. He is the oldest player who played in only one Major League Baseball game. Although not recognized as an official statistic until after his death, he is credited with a save for his 1-inning MLB career.

References

External links

1902 births
1967 deaths
Major League Baseball pitchers
Cincinnati Reds players
Baseball players from Ohio
People from Wood County, Ohio